Antonín Kříž (born 29 October 1943) is a former Czech cyclist. He competed in the team pursuit at the 1964 Summer Olympics.

References

1943 births
Living people
Czech male cyclists
Olympic cyclists of Czechoslovakia
Sportspeople from Prague
Cyclists at the 1964 Summer Olympics